Sven Unger was a Swedish football forward who played for Sweden. He also played for IK Sleipner.

References

External links

Swedish footballers
Sweden international footballers
Association football forwards
1938 FIFA World Cup players
IK Sleipner players
1909 births
2001 deaths